Tax buoyancy is an indicator to measure efficiency and responsiveness of revenue mobilization in response to growth in the Gross domestic product or National income.  

A tax is said to be buoyant if the tax revenues increase more than proportionately in response to a rise in national income or output.

Usually, tax elasticity is considered a better indicator to measure tax responsiveness.

See also
 Elasticity (economics)

References

Economic indicators
Tax terms